Ochiltree is a village in East Ayrshire, Scotland

Ochiltree may also refer to:

Ochiltree (surname)
Ochiltree County, Texas, a county in Texas, United States
Lord Ochiltree, a title in the Peerage of Scotland

See also
Ochiltree Castle (disambiguation)
Ocheltree, Kansas